Aigler Alumni Building, formerly the College Hill School, is a historic building in Tiffin, Ohio, that was listed in the National Register on February 12, 1979. It is one of ten buildings on the Heidelberg University campus listed on the National Register of Historic Places.

History 
The building is named for alumni Allan G. Aigler, Class of 1902, who was a trustee of the university from 1926–1960. The Aigler Alumni Building was purchased by Heidelberg University from the Tiffin City Board of Education in 1961, and was outfitted for use as a classroom, office, and laboratory building. It had previously functioned as an elementary school. In 2010 the Graduate Studies Office, psychology, criminal justice and political science moved into the building when the School of Business moved into the newly remodeled Adams Hall.

See also
 Historic preservation
 History of education in the United States
 National Register of Historic Places in Seneca County, Ohio

References

Further reading

External links
 
 

School buildings on the National Register of Historic Places in Ohio
Buildings and structures in Seneca County, Ohio
National Register of Historic Places in Seneca County, Ohio
Heidelberg University (Ohio)